The women's compound archery competition at the 2001 World Games took place from 17 to 19 August 2001 at the Opas Skiing Spot in Akita, Japan.

Competition format
A total of 11 archers entered the competition. The best four athletes from preliminary round qualifies to the semifinals.

Results

Preliminary round

Finals

References

External links
 Results on IWGA website

Field archery at the 2001 World Games